Powiat grodziski may refer to either of two counties (powiats) in Poland:
Grodzisk Wielkopolski County, in Greater Poland Voivodeship (west-central Poland)
Grodzisk Mazowiecki County, in Masovian Voivodeship (east-central Poland)